Lacken Malateste, born January 5, 1989, in Papeete (Tahiti) is a swimmer Tahitian several times medalist at the 2003 Pacific Games.

Career

At the 2003 Pacific Games, she won:
a gold medal in the 400 meters medley
a silver medal in the 200 meters butterfly
four bronze medals in the 200 meters freestyle relay 4 x 100 meters medley 4 (a team with Vaea Sichan, Raina Vongue and Nancy Lau), the relay 4 x 100 meters freestyle (same team) and that the relay 4 x 200 meters freestyle (same team).

She owns, since 20 July 2005, the records of Tahiti in 200-meters butterfly in 2 min 23 s 95 and 400 meters medley 4, 5 min 15 s 126. Her best performances of this same distances are 2 min 21 s 81 to 200 meters butterfly, conducted in July 2004, and 5 min 9 s 20 to 400 meters medley 4, completed in April 2005.

References

Living people
1989 births
People from Papeete
Tahitian women
Tahitian female swimmers
Female medley swimmers
Female butterfly swimmers